The Cameroon men's national volleyball team represents Cameroon in international volleyball competitions and friendly matches.

Results

World Championship
1990 — 15th place
2010 — 13th place
2014 — 21st place
2018 — 19th place
2022 — 23rd place

World Cup
1989 — 8th place

Current squad
The following is the Cameroonian roster in the 2022 World Championship.

Head coach:  Guy-Roger Nanga

References

External links
FIVB profile

Volleyball
National men's volleyball teams
Volleyball in Cameroon
Men's sport in Cameroon